Dololo is a settlement in Kwale County, Kenya.

References 

Populated places in Coast Province
Kwale County